Hawkshaw the Detective was a comic strip character featured in an eponymous cartoon serial by Gus Mager from February 23, 1913, to November 12, 1922, and again from December 13, 1931, to 1952. (The revival was a topper to The Captain and the Kids.)<ref>Stripper's Guide: Obscurity of the Day: Oliver's Adventures Holtz, Allan. "Obscurity of the Day: Oliver's Adventures April 15, 2010.</ref> The name of Mager's character was derived from the common American slang of the time, in which a hawkshaw meant a detective—that slang itself derived from playwright Tom Taylor's use of the name for the detective in his 1863 stage play The Ticket of Leave Man.

Characters and story
Sherlocko
Hawkshaw the Detective was based on one of Mager's "monk" characters (so called because they looked a lot like monkeys), "Sherlocko the Monk," who made his first appearance in 1910. That name was scrapped after Arthur Conan Doyle, the creator of Sherlock Holmes, threatened legal action over the parodied name. (Sherlocko's bumbling partner Watso did not survive the renaming, either; he became "The Colonel.")

Sherlocko used careful examination of clues and his knowledge of human nature to solve the crimes. Almost invariably they were done by some other "monk" character in the course of his regular activities (Groucho, Forgetto, Henpecko, Nervo ...). On 12-1-1911, a genuine criminal, Black Pete, makes his first appearance.

Knocko
Groucho
An earlier version of Sherlocko, entitled Knocko the Monk, spawned a fad of nicknames ending in O, which prompted a vaudeville monologist named Art Fisher, while playing poker with four brothers who performed together, to give them all such names. One of the brothers got a name that belonged to one of the characters in the strip: Groucho, one of the monks. Fisher named the other brothers Harpo, Chicko (later re-spelled "Chico") and Gummo. At various times, however, the different Marx Brothers provided different reasons for the names, so Knocko the Monk may not, in fact, have been the inspiration.

Hawkshaw
Hawkshaw the Detective, played originally by Horace Wigan, debuted in the 1863 play of Tom Taylor, The Ticket of Leave Man. His character was taken up by  the New York World on February 23, 1913, and continued for many years in various Pulitzer-owned newspapers. In 1917, some of Hawkshaw and the Colonel's newspaper antics were republished in book form by the Saalfield Company.

Film adaptation
In 1912, the comic strip was adapted in two live-action comedy films, The Robbery at the Railroad Station and The Henpeckos''.

Robert E. Howard

Included amongst Robert E. Howard's earliest published works were three stories featuring Hawkshaw the Detective and the Colonel.

References

External links
 Hawkshaw at Don Markstein's Toonopedia
 

1913 comics debuts
1922 comics endings
1931 comics debuts
1952 comics endings
American comics adapted into films
American comics characters
American comic strips
Comics characters introduced in 1913
Comics spin-offs
Crime comics
Detective comics
Fictional detectives
Humor comics
Male characters in comics
Sherlock Holmes pastiches
Comic strips started in the 1910s